Eugene Richards (born 1944) is an American documentary photographer

Eugene or Gene Richards may also refer to:
Eugene Lamb Richards (1863–1927), American football player, lawyer, and politician
Gene Richards (baseball) (born 1953), American baseball player
Gene Richards (racing driver) (died 1982), American race car driver

See also
Eugène Richard (1843–1925), Swiss politician
Jean Richard (1921–2001), French actor
Jean Richard (historian) (born 1921), French historian